SWI/SNF-related matrix-associated actin-dependent regulator of chromatin subfamily A containing DEAD/H box 1 is a protein that in humans is encoded by the SMARCAD1 gene.

Proper expression of SMARCAD1 may be important to fingerprint development, and the disruption of its expression is believed to cause adermatoglyphia, the absence of fingerprints.

References

Further reading